Alamzeb, Alamzaib, or Alam Zeb may refer to:

Alamzaib Mahsud, Pashtun human rights activist in Pakistan
Alamzeb Mujahid, Pashtun comedian living in Singapore
Alam Zeb (athlete), Pakistani middle-distance runner